Bálint Hóman (29 December 1885 – 2 June 1951) was a Hungarian scholar and politician who served as Minister of Religion and Education twice: between 1932–1938 and between 1939–1942. He died in prison in 1951 for his support of the fascistic invasion of the Soviet Union and antisemitic legislation activity as part of the Axis alliance in World War II.

Academic career
He was born into a Roman Catholic family. He finished his studies in Budapest. He started his career when he was still a student, working for the University Library of Budapest. He was appointed director of the National Széchényi Library in 1922, and of the Hungarian National Museum in 1923, a position he held until 1932.

Hóman produced several serious scholarly works. The centre of his research was the history of the Hungarian nation during the Middle Ages. Initially he dealt with economic history, social history and the auxiliary sciences of history. He wrote about Hungarian towns during the Árpád era, social classes, the first state tax and about the Magyar tribes who migrated to the Carpathian Basin. He authored a massive work entitled History of the Hungarian Currency 1000–1325, in which he systematized the Hungarian currency during the Middle Ages' chronology, metrology and history. His other key solo publication was The Finance, Affairs and Economic Policy of the Kingdom of Hungary During the Reign of Charles Robert.

He published many essays and books together with fellow scholar Gyula Szekfű. Their most prominent work was a well-regarded Hungarian History.

According to Hóman's point of view, it was necessary in this historical analysis to consider the ancient Hungarian words, the Sumerian and Hattian–Hurrian literary monuments.

Political career
Hóman rose as part of the increasingly pro-German orientation of Hungarian politics in the 1930s. He served as Minister of Religion and Education in the cabinet of Gyula Gömbös and Kálmán Darányi. After a one-year gap he was again appointed a minister. He was the deputy chairman of the Party of National Unity beginning in 1938. In the government, he was a vocal proponent of anti-Jewish actions, and sponsored a law to revoke the status of Hungarian Jewish groups.

"He remained opposed to national socialism and did not take an oath of allegiance to Arrow Cross leader Ferenc Szálasi despite his anti-Semitic views. He is also reported to have personally intervened to save a number of Jewish intellectuals and artists from deportation in the spring and summer of 1944."

He opposed the peace negotiations of 1943 with the western allies that would have removed Hungary from the Axis alliance. He chose to remain in the legislature after the German occupation (March 1944) and the coup d'état of the Arrow Cross Party (October 1944). During the brief period of German rule and that of their allies in the Arrow Cross, Hóman co-signed a document with other legislators that called for the expulsion of Hungary's Jews; over a half million were quickly sent to Nazi death camps, including Auschwitz, where most perished. When the Red Army crossed the Hungarian border in December 1944, he fled to Transdanubia along with Arrow Cross Party members (including party leader Ferenc Szálasi). Later he escaped to Germany, but the American troops captured him.

In 1946, the People's Tribunal sentenced Hóman to life imprisonment on war crimes charges, chiefly connected to his vote in the legislature in favor of Hungary's role in the Nazi Germany-led invasion of the USSR. Hóman was imprisoned in Vác, where he sickened quickly after the trials. According to reports, he lost 60 kilograms of body weight during a short time.

Death and legacy
Hóman died in prison on 2 June 1951.

On 6 March 2015 Hóman was rehabilitated after a ruling by the Metropolitan Court of Budapest, which found that the original trial had inadequate evidence.

A private foundation proposed building a life-size bronze statue of Hóman in Székesfehérvár. European Jewish Congress President Moshe Kantor condemned the project as "a shocking display of insensitivity towards the Jewish people", and US and other diplomats joined a rally against the statue. The US government urged Hungarian officials to block what press reports termed the 'anti-Semitic' statue, pointing out that government funds were being used to pay part of its costs. After protests by the Jewish community, city government voted to scrap plans for the statue.

Publications
 A magyar városok az Árpádok korában [Hungarian towns during the Árpád era] (Budapest, 1908)
 Magyar pénztörténet 1000–1325 [History of the Hungarian Currency 1000–1325] (Budapest, 1916)
 A magyar királyság pénzügyei és gazdaságpolitikája Károly Róbert korában [The finance affairs and economic policy of the Kingdom of Hungary during the reign of Charles Robert] (Budapest, 1921)
 A Szent László-kori Gesta Ungarorum és a XII–XIII. századi leszármazói [The Saint Ladislaus aged Gesta Hungarorum and its ancestors of the 12th–13th century] (Budapest, 1925)
 A magyar hun hagyomány és hun monda [The Hungarian Hunnic tradition and Hunnic legend] (Budapest, 1925)
 A forráskutatás és forráskritika története [History of the source research and source criticism] (Budapest, 1925)
 Magyar történet [Hungarian History] (1458-ig, a továbbiakat Szekfű Gyula írta; Budapest, é. n. )
 Egyetemes történet [World history] (I–IV. Szerk.: H. B., Szekfű Gyula, Kerényi Károly; Budapest, 1935–1937)
 Ősemberek – Ősmagyarok [Prehistoric men – Prehistoric Hungarians] (Atlanta, 1985)
 A történelem útja. Válogatott tanulmányok [The way of the history. Selected studies] (Vál.: Buza János; Budapest, 2002)

References

 Magyar Életrajzi Lexikon

1885 births
1951 deaths
Antisemitism in Hungary
Hungarian collaborators with Nazi Germany
Hungarian nationalists
Hungarian people convicted of war crimes
Hungarian people of World War II
Hungarian prisoners sentenced to life imprisonment
Education ministers of Hungary
Politicians from Budapest
Prisoners sentenced to life imprisonment by Hungary
Hungarian politicians convicted of crimes
Hungarian people who died in prison custody
Prisoners who died in Hungarian detention